Terry Capp is a Canadian Drag racer who was inducted into the Canadian Motorsport Hall of Fame in 2001. He won the Top Fuel championship at the NHRA U.S. Nationals in Indianapolis in 1980. In the early part of his career Bernie Fedderly acted as crew chief.

References

Living people
Year of birth missing (living people)
Place of birth missing (living people)
Canadian racing drivers
Dragster drivers
20th-century Canadian people